Ben Barkema (born October 6, 1984) is a former American football tight end who played for the Cleveland Browns. He played college football at Iowa State and was selected as an undrafted free agent by the Browns after the 2008 NFL Draft.

References 

 ESPN - Ben Barkema - Iowa State Cyclones
 Missouri State Bears - Ben Barkema
 

1984 births
Players of American football from Iowa
Iowa State Cyclones football players
Living people
People from Muscatine, Iowa
Muscatine High School alumni